Thecalia is a monotypic genus of bivalves belonging to the family Carditidae. The only species is Thecalia concamerata.

The species is found in Southern Africa.

References

Carditidae
Bivalve genera
Monotypic mollusc genera